Route 169 is a  state highway in the U.S. states of Connecticut and Massachusetts. It begins in the city of Norwich, Connecticut, and runs  through Northeastern Connecticut, continuing across the state line into Southbridge, Massachusetts. The route ends in Charlton after another .

Route description

Route 169 begins at an intersection with Route 2 and Route 32 in Norwich and heads northeast to the Taftville section of Norwich, where it briefly overlaps Route 97 and turns south before crossing the Shetucket River into Lisbon.  In Lisbon, Route 169 continues generally northeast, intersecting I-395 before continuing into Canterbury.  In Canterbury, Route 169 continues north, generally parallel to the Quinebaug River although not actually along it, before crossing into Brooklyn.  In Brooklyn, it continues north, bisecting the town, before crossing into Pomfret.  In Pomfret, it continues north, overlapping US 44 through the center of town, before continuing north into Woodstock.  In Woodstock, it continues north past the Woodstock Airport, briefly overlapping Route 171, before heading generally northwest to the Massachusetts state line.

In Massachusetts, Route 169 is an undivided two-lane highway through the towns of Southbridge and Charlton. It begins as North Woodstock Road, briefly overlaps Route 131 as part of East Main Street, then splits north on Mechanic Street at the American Optical rotary, bypassing Southbridge center. At the north end of Mechanic Street, the highway follows Worcester Street north to the Charlton town line, where it changes its name to Southbridge Road. It ends at U.S. Route 20 in Charlton City, a village in Charlton.

A  stretch of Route 169, running from Rocky Hollow Road in Lisbon to the Massachusetts state line, is a designated National Scenic Byway and state scenic road known for its vibrant autumn foliage and historic communities. The entire route within Connecticut is also designated the General Israel Putnam Highway. The portion of Route 169 in Pomfret Center between Bradley Road and Woodstock Road is a historic district known as the Pomfret Street Historic District.

History
The Norwich and Woodstock Turnpike was a private toll road incorporated in 1801 connecting the city of Norwich to the town center of Woodstock. The corporation was dissolved in 1846. The turnpike left Norwich using Canterbury Turnpike, crossing the Shetucket River at Occum and continuing northeast on Kinsman Hill Road to Route 169. The turnpike then followed Route 169 all the way to Woodstock and the Massachusetts state line. In 1923, state routes were first designated in Connecticut and Massachusetts. The route from downtown Norwich to Taftville and Baltic along Harland Road and modern Route 97 was designated as State Highway 187. A loop route of New England Route 12 between Taftville and Jewett City via the village of Newent (partly along modern Route 138) was designated as State Highway 356. In northeastern Connecticut, the route from Putnam to Woodstock and beyond to the Massachusetts state line (partly along modern Route 171) was assigned State Highway 142. In Massachusetts, the road from Southbridge center via Charlton along modern Route 169, then to West Auburn along modern US 20, was assigned as State Highway 124. By 1931, Highway 124 was relocated along roughly modern I-84 from the Connecticut state line in Holland via Sturbridge center to Charlton, then continuing along its original route to West Auburn. The former alignment of Highway 124 was redesignated as Highway 124A.

In 1932, most of the turnpike route was renumbered as Route 93 as part of a major statewide renumbering of roads. Portions of old Highways 187 (Norwich-Taftville) and 356 (Taftville-Newent) were utilized for the new Route 93. At the same time, Massachusetts renumbered Highway 124A as Route 93 to maintain number continuity across the state line. On January 1, 1959, Route 93 was renumbered to Route 169 in both Connecticut and Massachusetts because the route number was to be used for I-93.

In April 1991, the Connecticut Department of Transportation (ConnDOT) designated Route 169 as a Connecticut Scenic Road. This designation ran between Lisbon and the Massachusetts state line in Woodstock. Two years later, the highway was named to the country’s top 10 scenic byways by Scenic America. The highway was then designated a National Scenic Byway in September 1996.

Junction list

See also

References

External links

Highway photos from Mile by mile

169
National Scenic Byways
Transportation in New London County, Connecticut
Transportation in Windham County, Connecticut
169
Transportation in Worcester County, Massachusetts
Norwich, Connecticut
Lisbon, Connecticut
Canterbury, Connecticut
Brooklyn, Connecticut
Pomfret, Connecticut
Woodstock, Connecticut
Southbridge, Massachusetts
Charlton, Massachusetts